Marcus Terrell Paulk (born October 12, 1986) is an American actor, singer, rapper and dancer best known for his role as Myles Mitchell in the UPN sitcom Moesha, which aired from 1996 through 2001. Being a proponent of good causes and a frequent participant in fund raisers, Paulk was the 1997 national spokesperson for the "Kids Are Paramount" campaign, which seeks to empower children with courage and confidence to overcome obstacles.

He also appeared with Bow Wow in the 2005 film Roll Bounce, Another Cinderella Story as Dustin, and with Antonio Banderas in the 2006 film Take the Lead. Paulk is currently working on a studio album. Further details for this project are TBA.
Paulk has also made appearances in Season 4 of The Bad Girls Club. In 2012, Marcus starred in the George Lucas film Red Tails. Paulk also starred in the 2015 feature film Sister Code with Amber Rose.

Television and film appearances
 Probaphope short (2018) Bart
 NBA short (2018) Fantasy Short Player
 SisterCode (2015) Lil Danger
 Black-ish (2015) Scootie
 Red Tails (2012) David "Deke" Watkins
 Mr. Box Office (2012) Jimmy, 1 episode
David E. Talbert's Suddenly Single (2012) Sylvester Stone, Jr.
 The Rig (2010) Andrew
 The Bad Girls Club (2009) Himself, 3 episodes
 The Adventures of Umbweki (2009) Nosha
 Another Cinderella Story (2008) Dustin/The Funk
 Extreme Movie (2008) Wyatt
 High School Musical 3: Senior Year (2008) Cameo: Boy at Troy's Party (uncredited)
 Taking Five (2007) Lincoln
 Take the Lead (2006) Eddie
 Roll Bounce (2005) Boo
 Going to the Mat (2004) one of the boys playing baseball at beginning
 Fillmore! (2003) Sonny Lombard, 1 episode
 Family Affair (2003) Josh, 1 episode
 Cedric the Entertainer Presents (2003) Darrin, 1 episode 
 The Hughleys (2002) Little V., 1 episode
 The Proud Family (2001-2004) Myron Lewinski, 4 episodes 
 The Nightmare Room (2001) Ryan, 1 episode
 The Parkers (1999) Myles Mitchell, 1 episode
 City Guys (1999) Stevie, 1 episode 
 3rd Rock From The Sun (1998) Jimmy, 1 episode 
 Safety Patrol (1998) Walt Whitman
 Nothing to Lose (1997) Joey Davidson 
 One Night Stand (1997) Young Charlie Carlyle 
 Moesha (1996–2001) Myles Mitchell, 127 episodes
 The Crew (1995) Boy at Christmas Party, 1 episode
 The Parent 'Hood (1995) Phil, 1 episode 
 Me and the Boys (1994-1995) Ryan, 2 episodes
 Martin (1994) season 3, episode 8, "Momma's Baby, Martin's Maybe" Marvin, 1 episode 
 The Fresh Prince of Bel-Air (1994) Boy on dad's back (uncredited)
 The Sinbad Show (1994) 1 episode 
 Thea (1994) Cedric, 1 episode
 Grace Under Fire (1993) Food Group: Bread, 1 episode

Commercials
 2012 Honda Civic'''s Clearance Event (2012) as Tim Taylor, the Wingman
 Sprite (2004) 
 State Farm Auto Insurance (2003)
 Yoplait Go-Gurt'' (2000)

References

External links
 

1986 births
Place of birth missing (living people)
Living people
African-American male actors
American male child actors
American male film actors
American male television actors
21st-century African-American people
20th-century African-American people